Sira is a river in southwestern Norway. The headwaters of the river is the lake Ytre Storevatnet and it flows south through the Sirdalen valley in the municipalities of Sirdal and Flekkefjord. The river flows through the large lakes Sirdalsvatnet and Lundevatnet before heading south on the Agder/Rogaland county border. At the village of Åna-Sira the river empties into the Åna fjord. The river runs through several large villages such as Åna-Sira, Sira, Tonstad, Lunde, and Kvæven. The river drains the  watershed. The Tonstad Hydroelectric Power Station is powered by water from the waterfalls along this river.

Media gallery

See also
List of rivers in Norway

References

Sirdal
Flekkefjord
Sokndal
Rivers of Agder
Rivers of Rogaland
Rivers of Norway